Leon F. Harvey (October 20, 1837 – November 19, 1912) was an American entomologist, physician, and dentist. He was a founding member of the Buffalo Society of Natural Sciences, serving as its first treasurer and later as its president.

Early life and education 
Harvey was born in Buffalo in 1837. He completed his medical education at Thomas Jefferson University in 1859, and practiced medicine and dentistry in Baltimore and Buffalo. For several years he managed a provident dispensary in Buffalo. He was an avid amateur entomologist and published scientific articles on the butterflies and moths of North America, including descriptions of new species, such as the white flower moth.

Death 
Harvey died in 1912 at age 75, in New Rochelle, New York.

References 

1837 births
1912 deaths
American entomologists
19th-century American physicians
American dentists
Thomas Jefferson University alumni
Physicians from Buffalo, New York
19th-century dentists